Eshkol is a Hebrew language word meaning "cluster", usually of grapes. When not related to the Hebrew Bible and botany (where it can also mean "raceme", a region of a flowering plant's anatomy), it is normally associated with the third Israeli prime minister, Levi Eshkol.

Eshkol can refer to:
People
Levi Eshkol, Israeli Prime Minister
Miriam Eshkol, wife of Levi Eshkol
Eshkol Nevo, Israeli author and grandson of the politician
Other uses
Eshkol Academy, a former Orthodox Jewish school in the United States
Eshkol Power Station, a power plant in Israel named after Levi Eshkol
Eshkol Regional Council, a district in southern Israel named after Levi Eshkol
Ramat Eshkol, a Jerusalem neighbourhood named after Levi Eshkol

Hebrew-language surnames